Guangfu Avenue Subdistrict is a subdistrict located in the southern section of Hebei District, Tianjin, China. It shares border with Wanghailou Subdistrict to its north, Wangchuanchang and Chunhua Subdistricts to its east, Xiaobailou and Quanyechang Subdistricts to its south, as well as Nanshi and Gulou Subdistricts to its west. Its total population was 53,407 as of 2010.

The subdistrict was named after Guangfu Avenue that runs through it.

Geography 
Guangfu Avenue subdistrict is on the northern shore of Hai River

History

Administrative divisions 
At the time of writing, Guangfu Avenue Subdistrict consists of 9 residential communities, they are:

Gallery

References 

Township-level divisions of Tianjin
Hebei District, Tianjin